Kalateh-ye Shahida Zarsa (also Romanized as Kalāteh-ye Shahīdā Zarsā; also known as Sanjarābād) is a village in Badranlu Rural District, in the Central District of Bojnord County, North Khorasan Province, Iran. At the 2006 census, its population was 650, in 130 families.

References 

Populated places in Bojnord County